The Fresno State Bulldogs women's basketball team represents California State University, Fresno, located in Fresno, California, in NCAA Division I basketball competition. They play their home games at the Save Mart Center and are members of the Mountain West Conference.

History
The Bulldogs have an all-time record of 739–562 as of the end of the 2015–16 season. Fresno State has made the NCAA Tournament seven times (2008, 2009, 2010, 2011, 2012, 2013, 2014) but have never gone past the First Round. Before they left the Western Athletic Conference in 2012, the Bulldogs won four WAC titles.

Postseason results

NCAA Division I

AIAW Division I
The Bulldogs made one appearance in the AIAW National Division I basketball tournament, with a combined record of 0–2.

References

External links